The 2018 Gator Bowl was a college football bowl game played on December 31, 2018. It was the 74th edition of the Gator Bowl, and one of the 2018–19 bowl games concluding the 2018 FBS football season. Sponsored by the financial technology company TaxSlayer, the game was officially known as the TaxSlayer Gator Bowl, after four seasons without "Gator" in the bowl name.

Teams
The game featured the NC State Wolfpack from the Atlantic Coast Conference (ACC) and the Texas A&M Aggies from the Southeastern Conference (SEC); the teams had never played each other. This was Texas A&M's second Gator Bowl and NC State's fourth.

NC State Wolfpack

NC State received and accepted a bid to the Gator Bowl on December 2. The Wolfpack entered the bowl with a 9–3 record (5–3 in conference).

Texas A&M Aggies

Texas A&M received and accepted a bid to the Gator Bowl on December 2. The Aggies entered the bowl with an 8–4 record (5–3 in conference).

Game summary
After holding a 21–13 lead at halftime, Texas A&M outscored NC State 31–0 in the second half, for a 52–13 final. Aggie running back Trayveon Williams set a new Gator Bowl rushing record with 236 yards, breaking the prior record of 216 that had been set in the 1966 edition by Floyd Little. The game's attendance of 38,206 was the smallest since the 1950s.

Scoring summary

Statistics

References

External links

Box score at ESPN

Gator Bowl
Gator Bowl
Gator Bowl
Gator Bowl
NC State Wolfpack football bowl games
Texas A&M Aggies football bowl games